Felician(us) of Foligno (c. 160 – c. 250) is the patron saint of Foligno.

Biography
According to Christian tradition, he was born in Forum Flaminii (present-day San Giovanni Profiamma), on the Via Flaminia, of a Christian family, around 160.  He was the spiritual student of Pope Eleuterus and evangelized in Foligno, Spello, Bevagna, Assisi, Perugia, Norcia, Plestia, Trevi, and Spoleto.

He was later consecrated bishop of Foligno by Pope Victor I around 204 (he was the first bishop to receive the pallium as a symbol of his office).  He ordained Valentine of Terni as a priest.  His episcopate lasted for more than 50 years; he was one of the first Christian bishops of northern Italy.  He was arrested at the age of 94 for refusing to sacrifice to the Roman gods during the persecutions of Decius. He was tortured and scourged, and died outside Foligno while being conveyed to Rome for his execution.

Saint Messalina

Saint Messalina was a consecrated virgin who had received the religious veil from Felician. She cared for him during his imprisonment, and for this she was also arrested and clubbed to death when she refused to sacrifice to the Roman gods.

Veneration
A church was built over his grave at Foligno. His relics were transferred to Metz on October 4, 970.  In 965 some relics were translated to Minden in Germany; Felician was thus erroneously considered a bishop of that German city (and he had a separate feast day of October 20), an error that entered the Roman Martyrology.  Some of his relics were later returned to Foligno in 1673–4.

Foligno Cathedral preserves a statue of the saint, of silver and bronze, made by the sculptor Giovanni Battista Maini.

Notes

External links
Felician of Foligno
 San Feliciano di Foligno
 San Feliciano

3rd-century Italian bishops
Bishops of Foligno
160 births
250 deaths
3rd-century Christian martyrs